Russian National Autonomous Party was one of political parties of ethnic Rusyns in Second Czechoslovak Republic. It was founded by Štepan Fencik, just ahead of the 1935 Czechoslovak parliamentary election, in March 1935 in Mukachevo. Fencik was elected to parliament. The party published Nash puť ('Our Path').

The party advocated for full political autonomy of Subcarpathian Rus' within the Second Czechoslovak Republic. Politically, it displayed anti-semitic and far right characteristics. In the programmatic declarations of the party, it demanded recognition of the Carpatho-Russian national minority, support or Slavic ideas and genuine democracy.

Footnotes

References 
 

Antisemitism in the Czech Republic
Interwar minority parties in Czechoslovakia
Political parties established in 1935
Rusyn political parties
1935 establishments in Czechoslovakia